Chakrata is a cantonment town and also a sub district/tehsil, in Dehradun district in the state of Uttarakhand, India.

It lies between the Tons and Yamuna rivers, at an elevation of 2118 m, 98 km from the state capital, Dehradun. Chakrata was originally a cantonment of the British Indian Army. To the west lies Himachal Pradesh, and to the east are Mussoorie (73 km) and Tehri Garhwal.

History
The area is known as Jaunsar-Bawar, which has a marked presence in few surrounding villages.

In 1901, Chakrata Tehsil was part of the Dehradun district, of United Provinces, with a collective population of 51,101, which consisted of the towns of Chakrata (population 1250) and Kalsi, with a population of 760, which is most known for the rock edict of the Mauryan king Ashoka 2nd century BC, first discovered by John Forest, in 1860.

The cantonment 
A cantonment of British Indian Army, was established in 1869  by Colonel Hume of the 55th Regiment, British Indian Army, and the troops and officers first occupied the cantonment in April 1869.

Chakrata is an access-restricted military cantonment, and foreigners face severe restrictions in visiting. Notably, it is the permanent garrison of the secretive and elite Special Frontier Force, also known as 'Establishment 22' (called "Two-Two"), the only ethnic Tibetan unit of the Indian Army, which was raised after the Sino-India War of 1962. Weapons and survival training is also imparted by other intelligence services in Chakrata, in support of Indian foreign policy goals, especially pertaining to other countries in the Indian Subcontinent.

Tourism and nature 

Chakrata can be reached from Dehradun via Mussoorie or Vikasnagar passing through kalsi Gate (where Ashoka Stumbh is situated). Both routes pass through beautiful mountainous roads. Travelling in the monsoon can be tricky as the area sees frequent road blockages due to landslides.

The area has an abundance of conifers, rhododendrons and oaks. The red rhododendrons are the most abundantly found in this region. The attractions near Chakrata are:
 Tiger Falls is one of the highest direct waterfalls in Uttarakhand. It is 20 km from Chakrata and has an elevation of 312 ft. 
Budher (Moila Danda) is a picturesque meadow at an altitude of 2800 metres. The Karst landscapes of Budher are home to a network of ancient limestone caves.
 Kanasar is surrounded by one of the best-rated Deodar forest of Asia. About 25 km from Chakrata market on Tuini Road, the roads are not in the best shape. The meadows and giant trees more than make up for the bumpy drive. It is one of the best picnic spots near Chakrata. A forest rest house in Kanasar and some tented accommodation allows visitors to spend a night here on prior booking.
 Chilmiri sunset point at 4 km from main Chakrata market is a picturesque plateau offering one of the best views of sunset.
Deoban perched at about 2900 meters offers a panoramic view of the Himalayas.
 Mundali meadows are hard to access yet hold a huge potential for winter sports.
 Lakhamandal is an ancient Hindu temple complex dedicated to Shiva and associated with the Pandavas. It is slightly further from Chakrata and may take almost a whole day of driving and coming back. For heritage and a long drive, this Archaeological Survey of India protected site is a must visit.
Bairat Khai (The Princess of Hills), also known as Bairat Khai Pass is 25 km east of Chakrata where people can witness 180-degree view of snow-covered Himalayas throughout the year in the north.  Situated at an altitude of about 1990 meters, Bairat Khai is surrounded by the peaks of Chorani Dhar at 2300 meters in the west and Julioki Dhar at 2150 meters also known as Tiger hill locally in the eastern side. Bairat Khai has deep valleys on the north and southern side of the pass where you can see villages and houses built in the valleys. Tourists flock here to witness snowfall in the winters and pleasant weather in summers also attract the tourists in huge numbers. Mussoorie is 54 km from Bairat Khai.
Manjhgaon is an ancient Hindu temple dedicated to Lord Shiva. It is called Massu Devta in regional language. It is 15 kilometres from Chakrata market. It is the oldest temple in the region.

Extended destinations
Hanol is 100 km from Chakrata and is a beautiful getaway in the middle of nowhere. For those who want to explore and drive/ride nearby, Hanol is a good destination. A Garhwal Mandal Vikas Nigam Ltd. (GMVN) hotel provides basic accommodation in Hanol. Hanol has Mahasu Devta Temple dedicated to Lord Mahasu.  Mahasu Devta is worshiped in the entire Jaunsar-babar region and is at seven places across this region like Radina, Thaina, Indroli, Lakhwar, and Lakhamandal.

There are a dozen decent private hotels and some eateries. Petrol and diesel are hard to come by (for civilians) but can be obtained in small quantities from local traders. The hotels of Chakrata are Blue Canvas Resort, Golden arc, Hotel Burans, Hotel Himalayan Paradise, Hotel Snow View, and Gwasa Water Valley Resort, Hotel MRB Residency.

Demographics 

As of 2011 India census, Chakrata town falls under 15.70 square km. There are 759 households, and urban Chakrata has a population of 5,117 of which males are 3,717 (73%) and females 1,400 (27%). 73% of the population falls under the general category, while 11% are from schedule caste and 17% are schedule tribes. Child (aged under 6 years) population of Chakrata (CB) cantonment board is 7%, among them 54% are boys and 46% are girls. There are 759 households in the city and an average 7 persons live in every family. 84% of the population (4,293 persons) is 'literate'.

The sub-district Chakrata has a total population of 67,258, with 34,938 males and 32,320 females. The total area of the sub-district is 542.59 square km. Apart from the area under the cantonment board, Chakrata falls under the 'rural' category.

In the sub-district, the demographics are starkly different from the urban area, with 34.6% (23,265 persons) belonging to Scheduled castes, and 54.9% (36,919 persons) to Scheduled Tribes. 51.2% of the population, i.e. 34,440 persons are 'literate'.

Civic Administration 
The urban area of Chakrata falls under the jurisdiction of the Urban Local Body in Chakrata, the Cantonment Board (CB). There are 6 wards.
The cantonment board consists of 12 members, including 6 elected members.

See also
Buraswa

Notes

References

External links 

 Chakrata Tahsil & Town, The Imperial Gazetteer of India, v. 10, p. 125, 1909
 Chakrata Tourism
 Chakrata on wikimapia
 Chakrata — A Gem of a Hill Station

Cities and towns in Dehradun district
Tourism in Uttarakhand
Cantonments of India
Hill stations in Uttarakhand